Kisköre is a town in Heves County, Hungary.

The sluice 
There is a hydroelectric sluice in Kisköre that was built in 1973 when Tisza Dam was completed.

External links

  in Hungarian

Populated places in Heves County